José Miguel Cotto Vázquez (born June 22, 1977) is a Puerto Rican professional boxer and a four-time regional level champion. He is the brother of six-time world boxing champion Miguel Cotto and the cousin of lightweight contender Abner Cotto.

Amateur career
In 1995, as an amateur, he participated at the Pan American Games in Mar del Plata, Argentina, and won a silver medal. A year later he represented his native country at the 1996 Summer Olympics, where he was defeated in the first round.

Pro career
He won the WBC Youth World super bantamweight title on August 20, 2000, a split decision win against a capable young Fernando Velardez (who would later fight Mexican legend Erik Morales for Morales' WBC Featherweight title).

On July 25, 2003, Cotto was supposed to fight in Phoenix, Arizona. However, his opponent had trouble getting a license to fight, as he had been knocked out recently and was serving a 45-day suspension from another state. The Arizona boxing commission was not able to find Cotto an opponent in time and the fight got cancelled.

On September 9, at his native Caguas, Cotto finally returned to action, with a first-round knockout win over Johnny Walker. On December 19, he fought Anthony Martinez in Aibonito, winning by an eighth-round knockout.

Cotto moved to Phoenix early in 2004. On April 14 of that year he stopped Mexican Luis Lizarraga at two minutes and thirty seven seconds of the first round to win the regional, International Boxing Council (IBC) Intercontinental super featherweight title. He has also won the vacant WBO intercontinental super featherweight title during his fight with Genaro Trazancos.

On August 6, he beat former WBA Bantamweight champion Al Kotey by a ten-round unanimous decision in San Juan. On August 20, 2005, Cotto would have boxed Manuel Medina, with a world title shot at stake. But he was not able to make the fight's weight limit and the fight was cancelled.

On January 29, 2005, Cotto knocked out Armando Cordoba in the first round to win the vacant WBO NABO lightweight title.

On January 20, 2006, Cotto knocked Ubaldo Hernandez out in seven rounds at Mayfield, California. On April 8, he received his first world title try, losing a twelve-round decision to Juan Díaz as part of a Pay Per View undercard, for the WBA world Lightweight title in an exciting fight where both contestants threw nearly a hundred punches per round.

In May 2007, he and Prawat Singwangcha (30-3-1, 18 KOs) battled to a twelve-round draw in a bout for the vacant WBA lightweight title.

Cotto then proceeded to fight Canelo Álvarez at welterweight. Cotto got off to a good start and almost knocked out Alvarez, in round 2 Cotto went down after missing a hook. The referee stopped the fight in round 9 after Cotto was trapped in the corner and was taking many flush right hands by Alvarez.

On April 9, 2011 he lost a 10-round unanimous decision to former IBF Light Welterweight champion Paulie Malignaggi, managing to buckle Maligaggi a couple of times.

He was scheduled to face former two time lightweight champion José Luis Castillo on February 11, 2012, though it was cancelled due to Castillo coming in overweight. On April 21, 2012 Jose Cotto beat Eric Cruz (13-8 13 KO's) by UD over 10 rounds, knocking the overmatched opponent down twice.

Professional boxing record (incomplete)

|-
|align="center" colspan=8|33 Wins (24 knockouts), 4 loss(s), 1 Draw, 0 No Contest 
|-
|align=center style="border-style: none none solid solid; background: #e3e3e3"|Res.
|align=center style="border-style: none none solid solid; background: #e3e3e3"|Record
|align=center style="border-style: none none solid solid; background: #e3e3e3"|Opponent
|align=center style="border-style: none none solid solid; background: #e3e3e3"|Type
|align=center style="border-style: none none solid solid; background: #e3e3e3"|Rd., Time
|align=center style="border-style: none none solid solid; background: #e3e3e3"|Date
|align=center style="border-style: none none solid solid; background: #e3e3e3"|Location
|align=center style="border-style: none none solid solid; background: #e3e3e3"|Notes
|-align=center
|Loss||33-4-1||align=left|  Manuel Pérez
||||| 
|align=left| 
|align=left|
|-align=center
|Win||33-3-1||align=left|  Eric Cruz
||||| 
|align=left| 
|align=left|
|-align=center
|Loss||32-3-1||align=left|  Paulie Malignaggi
|||||
|align=left| 
|align=left|
|-align=center
|Win||32-2-1||align=left|  Christopher Henry
|||||
|align=left| 
|align=left|
|-align=center
|Loss||31-2-1||align=left|  Canelo Álvarez
|||||
|align=left| 
|align=left|
|-align=center
|Win||31-1-1||align=left|  Ilido Julio
|||||
|align=left| 
|align=left|
|-align=center
|Win||30-1-1||align=left|  Martin Ramirez
|||||
|align=left| 
|align=left|
|-align=center
|Win||29-1-1||align=left|  Anthony Woods
|||||
|align=left| 
|align=left|
|-align=center
|style="background:#abcdef;"|Draw||28-1-1||align=left|  Prawet Singwancha
|||||
|align=left| 
|align=left|
|-align=center
|Win||28-1-0||align=left|  Ivan Hernandez
|||||
|align=left| 
|align=left|
|-align=center
|Loss||27-1-0||align=left|  Juan Díaz
|||||
|align=left| 
|align=left|
|-align=center
|Win||26-0-0||align=left|  Ubaldo Hernandez
|||||
|align=left| 
|align=left|
|-align=center
|Win||25-0-0||align=left|  Genaro Trazancos
|||||
|align=left| 
|align=left|
|-align=center
|Win||24-0-0||align=left|  Armando Cordoba
|||||
|align=left| 
|align=left|
|-align=center
|Win||23-0-0||align=left|  Alfred Kotey
|||||
|align=left| 
|align=left|
|-align=center
|Win||22-0-0||align=left|  Luis Alfonso Lizarraga
|||||
|align=left| 
|align=left|

See also 
 Boxing at the 1995 Pan American Games
 Boxing at the 1996 Summer Olympics
 List of Puerto Ricans

External links
 
 

|-

|-

|-

|-

Lightweight boxers
Boxers at the 1995 Pan American Games
Boxers at the 1996 Summer Olympics
Olympic boxers of Puerto Rico
People from Caguas, Puerto Rico
1977 births
Living people
Puerto Rican male boxers
Pan American Games silver medalists for Puerto Rico
Pan American Games medalists in boxing
Medalists at the 1995 Pan American Games